Throughout history, people have mysteriously disappeared at sea, many on voyages aboard floating vessels or traveling via aircraft. The following is a list of known individuals who have mysteriously vanished in open waters, and whose whereabouts remain unknown. In most ocean deaths, bodies are never recovered, but this fact alone does not make their disappearance mysterious. For example, the RMS Titanic was not a mysterious disappearance.



2nd century BC – 1969 
{|class="wikitable sortable plainrowheaders"
|- style="text-align:center;"
! width="105" | Date
! width="250" | Person(s)
! width="50" | Age
! width="150" | Missing from
! width="500px" | Circumstances
! width="10px" | 
|-
| data-sort-value="-100-01-01" | 2nd century BC
| Eudoxus of Cyzicus
| style="text-align:center;" | Unknown
| Gulf of Aden
| Greek navigator who explored the Arabian Sea for Ptolemy VIII Physcon, who is thought to have perished during a journey to circumnavigate Africa, but this has not been definitively confirmed.
| style="text-align:center;" |
|-
| rowspan="2" data-sort-value="1291-01-01" | 
| Vandino Vivaldi
| rowspan="2" style="text-align:center;" | Unknown
| rowspan="2"| Atlantic Ocean
| rowspan="2"|The Genoese sailor and explorer brothers were lost while attempting the first oceanic journey from Europe to Asia. Their two galleys sailed out of the Mediterranean Sea and into the Atlantic Ocean, but were not heard from again.
| rowspan="2" style="text-align:center;" |
|-
| Ugolino Vivaldi
|-
| data-sort-value="1307-01-01" |  or 
| Muhammad ibn Qu
| style="text-align:center;" | Unknown
| Atlantic Ocean
| The eighth mansa of the Mali Empire, who was said by his successor Mansa Musa to have disappeared in an attempt to discover the limits of the Atlantic Ocean. This account has fueled speculation that Musa's predecessor reached the Americas, but no evidence of his fate is known.
| style="text-align:center"|
|-
| data-sort-value="1346-01-01" | 
| Jaume Ferrer
| style="text-align:center;" | Unknown
| Atlantic Ocean
| Majorcan sailor who sailed down the west coast of Africa in search of the "River of Gold". The results of his quest, including his fate, are unknown.
| style="text-align:center;" |
|-
| data-sort-value="1487-01-01" | 1487
| João Afonso do Estreito
| style="text-align:center;" | Unknown
| Atlantic Ocean
| Portuguese sailor who was the co-captain of an expedition aiming to explore the Atlantic Ocean. He and his Flemish partner Ferdinand Van Olm set sail, but never returned, and were presumed lost at sea.
| style="text-align:center;" |
|-
| data-sort-value="1499-01-01" | 1499
| John Cabot
| style="text-align:center;" | c. 49
| Northwest Passage
| Cabot, an Italian explorer, departed with five ships during an expedition to find a western route from Europe to Asia. There are no known records of what happened to him and his expedition after that; it is not known if they disappeared at sea, remained in North America, or returned safely to Europe.
| style="text-align:center;" |
|-
| data-sort-value="1500-24-05" | 24 March 1500
| Vasco de Ataíde
| style="text-align:center;" | Unknown
| Cape Verde or Cape of Good Hope
| Portuguese sailor Vasco de Ataíde's ship was part of Pedro Álvares Cabral's 1500 expedition to India. On 24 March, the ship he captained and its 150 crew disappeared after sailing west toward Brazil. The chronicler of the expedition said that there were no strong or contrary winds that could have caused the loss.
| style="text-align:center;" |
|-
| data-sort-value="1501-01-01" | 1501
| 
| style="text-align:center;" | 50–51
| Northwest Passage
| Portuguese explorer Gaspar Corte-Real disappeared on an expedition to discover the Northwest Passage from Europe to Asia. Two of his ships returned to Lisbon, but the third, with Gaspar on board, was lost and never heard from again.
| style="text-align:center;" |
|-
| data-sort-value="1502-01-01" | 1502
| Miguel Corte-Real
| style="text-align:center;" | 53–54
| Northwest Passage
| Miguel Corte-Real, a Portuguese explorer, disappeared while searching for his brother Gaspar. Like his brother, he took three ships and, like his brother's ship, his own was lost and never heard from again.
| style="text-align:center;" |
|-
| data-sort-value="1511-01-01" | 1511
| Diego de Nicuesa
| style="text-align:center;" | Unknown
| Caribbean Sea
| Nicuesa, a Spanish conquistador and explorer, disappeared along with 17 crewmen while en route to Santo Domingo, after being denied entry to the colonial settlement of Santa María la Antigua del Darién.
| style="text-align:center;" |
|-
| data-sort-value="1526-01-01" | 1526
| Francisco de Hoces
| style="text-align:center;" | Unknown
| Pacific Ocean
| De Hoces was the commander of the San Lesmes which was one of the seven ships of the Loaísa expedition under García Jofre de Loaísa. It has been speculated that the San Lesmes, last seen in the Pacific Ocean in late May, reached Easter Island, the Polynesian archipelago, or even New Zealand.
| style="text-align:center;" |
|-
| data-sort-value="1579-01-01" | 1579
| Ikegusuku Antō
| style="text-align:center;" | Unknown
| East China Sea
| A bureaucrat of the Ryukyu Kingdom, Ikegusuku Antō was sent as an envoy to China, but his ship was caught in a storm and disappeared in the sea in 1579 and was never seen again.
| style="text-align:center;" |
|-
| data-sort-value="1611-06-23" | 23 June 1611
| Henry Hudson
| style="text-align:center;" | 45–46
| Northwest Passage
| Hudson went on multiple expeditions of present-day Canada and parts of the northeastern United States, searching for the Northwest Passage. In 1611, after wintering on the shore of James Bay, Hudson wanted to press on to the west, but most of his crew mutinied. The mutineers cast Hudson, his teenage son, and seven others adrift; the Hudsons and their companions were never seen again.
| style="text-align:center;" |
|-
| data-sort-value="1638-01-01" | 1638
| Urasoe Chōri
| style="text-align:center;" | Unknown
| Satsuma Domain
| A member of Sanshikan, Urasoe Chōri went on a boat trip to Satsuma, but his ship was caught in a storm and disappeared in the sea. He is believed to have drowned.
| style="text-align:center;" |
|-
| data-sort-value="1671-01-01" | c. 1671
| Roche Braziliano
| style="text-align:center;" | 40–41
| Location unknown
| A Dutch pirate born in the town of Groningen, Roche Braziliano, whose career lasted from 1654 until 1671, disappeared during that year, and was never seen again.
| style="text-align:center;" |
|-
| data-sort-value="1697-01-01" | 1679
| Fish-man
| style="text-align:center;" | Unknown
| Liérganes, Spain
| Mythical amphibian entity which reportedly had been captured by fishermen and later thought to be Francisco de la Vega Casar, a carpenter who had drowned in the Estuary of Bilbao five years prior. After spending several years with the humans, the "Fish-man" returned to sea and was never seen again.
| style="text-align:center;" |
|-
| data-sort-value="1686-04-01" | April 1686
| Michel de Grammont
| style="text-align:center;" | 40–41
| Near St. Augustine, Florida, U.S.
| The French privateer renowned for attacking Spanish flagships from 1670 to 1686, was lost in a storm together with his entire crew while on a rescue mission to save fellow buccaneer Nicolas Brigaut.
| style="text-align:center;" |
|-
| data-sort-value="1688-01-01" | 1688
| John Coxon
| style="text-align:center;" | Unknown
| Jamaica
| Coxon, a buccaneer and member of the Brethren of the Coast who was infamous for his various raids on the Spanish Main through the 17th century, turned to hunting pirates in 1682. He, his 97-man crew, and eighty-ton ship armed with eight guns, mysteriously disappeared in 1688, and their fate is unknown.
| style="text-align:center;" |
|-
| data-sort-value="1694-02-01" | 1694
| Dirk de Lange
| style="text-align:center;" | Unknown
| Indian Ocean
| De Lange arrived at the Cape of Good Hope on 9 January 1694, remaining there until 5 February. Van Holland sailed from the Cape with a crew of around 300, and two passengers, including Admiral Sir James Couper. She never reached her destination, and was never heard from again. Contemporary rumours suggested that she had sprung her mast rounding the Cape, limped north and been captured by pirates based at Fort Dauphin, near the south-eastern corner of Madagascar. However, Abraham Samuel, the pirate supposedly responsible, did not arrive in the area until 1695.
| style="text-align:center;" |
|-
| data-sort-value="1726" | January 1726
| Aagtekerke
| style="text-align:center;" | Various
| Indian Ocean
| The Aagtekerke, a ship of the Dutch East India Company, left for Batavia in the Dutch East Indies on 27 January 1726, but was lost with all hands and without trace. It was carrying silver coins and precious metals with a total value of 200,000 guilders. There is some evidence from the crew of the wrecked ship  that Aagtekerke was wrecked on the Abrolhos Islands, because they found some remains of a Dutch vessel that had been wrecked before them.
| style="text-align:center;" |
|-
| data-sort-value="1750-01-01" | 1750 or 1760
| Sea Bird
| style="text-align:center;" | Unknown
| Rhode Island, U.S.
| The Sea Bird, which also went by other names, was a merchant brig that, after a Honduras voyage and then grounding in Rhode Island at Easton's Beach in either 1750 or 1760, had lost its longboat. No people were found living on it; all that was found was a cat and a dog. The crew aboard was never seen again. The ship itself later disappeared as well and was not seen again.
| style="text-align:center;" |
|-
| data-sort-value="1758-10-28" | 28 October 1758
| Edward Moore, 5th Earl of Drogheda
| style="text-align:center;" | 56–57
| Irish Sea
| Edward Moore was an Anglo-Irish peer and politician who went missing in a storm at sea while travelling between Holyhead and Dublin and is believed to have died.
| style="text-align:center;" |
|-
| data-sort-value="1766-10-29" | 29 October 1766
| John Stanwix
| style="text-align:center;" | 75–76
| Atlantic Ocean
| The British soldier and politician was lost at sea while travelling from Dublin, Ireland to Holyhead, Wales in a packet boat.
| style="text-align:center;" |
|-
| rowspan="5" data-sort-value="1769-01-01" | c. January 1770
| Henry Vansittart
| style="text-align:center;" | 37
| rowspan="5"|Indian Ocean
| rowspan="5"|Vansittart, MP and director of the East India Company, Scrafton and Forde formed a delegation to investigate corruption and reform the British government in India and sailed on the frigate Aurora. Scottish Royal Navy midshipman Robert Pitcairn after whom the Pitcairn Islands are named, and Scottish epic poet William Falconer were also on board. The Aurora disappeared with all hands around January 1770, apparently in a storm. The captain had decided to sail the Mozambique Channel despite bad weather.
| rowspan="5" style="text-align:center;" |
|-
| Luke Scrafton
| style="text-align:center;" | Unknown
|-
| Francis Forde
| style="text-align:center;" | 51–52
|-
| William Falconer
| style="text-align:center;" | 37
|-
| Robert Pitcairn
| style="text-align:center;" | 17
|-
| data-sort-value="1778-01-01" | 1778
| Benjamin Church
| style="text-align:center;" | 43–44
| Caribbean Sea
| Church, the first Surgeon General of the United States Army, was imprisoned for communicating with the British in 1776. He was released in 1778, and shortly thereafter disappeared while sailing from Boston.
| style="text-align:center;" |
|-
| data-sort-value="1779-01-01" | 17 December 1779
| Thomas Lynch Jr.
| style="text-align:center;" | 30
| Caribbean Sea
| Thomas Lynch Jr. was a signer of the United States Declaration of Independence. In late 1779, he and his wife Elizabeth set sail to Sint Eustatius in the West Indies. The ship disappeared shortly after its departure.
| style="text-align:center;" |
|-
| data-sort-value="1780-01-01" | January 1780
| Morgan Connor
| style="text-align:center;" | Unknown
| Location unknown
| Connor, a Continental Army officer who served as Adjutant General in 1777, was lost at sea in January 1780.
| style="text-align:center;" |
|-
| data-sort-value="1780-12-01" | December 1780
| William Palfrey
| style="text-align:center;" | 38–39
| Atlantic Ocean
| William Palfrey was an American Patriot born in 1741. He went missing after getting lost at sea in December 1780 following a business trip to France.
| style="text-align:center;" |
|-
| data-sort-value="1781-12" | c. December 1781
| Charles Carpenter
| style="text-align:center;" | Unknown
| Location unknown
| Carpenter disappeared with the rest of the crew of HMS Necker, presumed foundered while sailing from Saint Helena to the East Indies.
| style="text-align:center;" |
|-
| data-sort-value="1781-03-01" | March 1781
| John Young
| style="text-align:center;" | 40–41
| Caribbean Sea
| Young, a captain of the American Continental Navy, was the commander of the USS Saratoga when it vanished at sea during a gale while returning home from present-day Haiti.
| style="text-align:center;" |
|-
| data-sort-value="1788-01-01" | 1788
| Jean-François de Galaup (Lapérouse) and his expedition
| style="text-align:center;" | 46–47 (Galaup)
| Botany Bay, Australia
| The French expedition of Jean-François de Galaup, Comte de Lapérouse, disappeared after their last stop at Botany Bay (now Sydney), after meeting ships of Britain's First Fleet bringing convicts to establish the new settlement that became Australia. The wrecks of the expedition's two ships, the Boussole and Astrolabe), were subsequently discovered by Dumont-D'Urville during his 2nd trip around the world at Vanikoro, an island in the Santa Cruz group (part of the Solomon Islands) where the survivors may have set up camp.
| style="text-align:center;" |
|-
| data-sort-value="1788-07-01" | July–August 1788
| Aimée du Buc de Rivéry
| style="text-align:center;" | 20
| Caribbean Sea
| Rivéry, a French heiress, vanished at sea while returning home to Martinique from the mainland. A popular legend suggests that she was abducted by pirates and sold as a concubine to the Ottoman Sultan under the name Nakşidil Sultan, but this has never been proven.
| style="text-align:center;" |
|-
|data-sort-value="1794" | 1794
| Robert Manners Sutton
| style="text-align:center;" | Unknown
| Mediterranean Sea
| Captain Robert Manners Sutton disappeared with the rest of the crew of HMS Ardent in 1794, believed lost to a fire and explosion.
| style="text-align:center;" |
|-
|data-sort-value="1797-01-31" | 31 January 1797
| William Mulso
| style="text-align:center;" | Unknown
| Location unknown
| Commander William Mulso disappeared with the rest of the crew of HMS Hermes on 31 January 1797, presumably foundered during a gale.
| style="text-align:center;" |
|-
|data-sort-value="1799-12-19" | 19 December 1799 or after
| Thomas Atkinson
| style="text-align:center;" | Unknown
| Atlantic Ocean
| Captain Atkinson disappeared with the rest of the crew of Mildred on or after 19 December 1799, while sailing from Jamaica.
| style="text-align:center;" |
|-
| data-sort-value="1800-08-01" | c. September 1800
| Patrick Fletcher
| style="text-align:center;" | Unknown
| West Indies
| Fletcher was in command of the USS Insurgent when it disappeared near the West Indies in 1800. A severe storm struck the West Indies on 20 September, and it is thought to have caused the loss as well as that of the Pickering.
| style="text-align:center;" |
|-
| data-sort-value="1800-08-01" | c. September 1800
| Joseph Ingraham
| style="text-align:center;" | 37–38
| West Indies
| Ingraham, an American sailor and maritime fur trader credited with discovering several islands in the Marquesas Islands territory as well as a three-year-long voyage across the world, disappeared while serving aboard the USS Pickering along with the rest of the crew, presumably lost in a gale.
| style="text-align:center;" |
|-
| data-sort-value="1779-01-01" | c. 25 October 1800
| Crew of the HMS Babet
| style="text-align:center;" | Various
| Caribbean Sea
| HMS Babet was a 20-gun sixth-rate post ship of the British Royal Navy. The vessel and her crew disappeared shortly after departing from Fort Royal Bay, Martinique on 24 October 1800. She is believed to have foundered during a tropical storm.
| style="text-align:center;" |
|-
| rowspan="2" data-sort-value="1802" | c. 1802/1803
| George Roper
| style="text-align:center;" | Unknown
| rowspan="2" |Location unknown
| rowspan="2" |The HCS Intrepid, captained by George Roper, and HCS Comet, captained by Lieutenant William Henry, were both sent by the East India Company to search for what caused the loss of the Earl Talbot. They reportedly made many discoveries relating to natural history and geography, and saw wreckage of other vessels on uninhabited islands, but found nothing further concerning Lord Eldon. By 1803, they were recognized to have disappeared without a trace, and presumed to have foundered at sea.
| rowspan="2" style="text-align:center;" |  
|-
|William Henry
|style="text-align:center;" |Unknown
|-
| data-sort-value="1803-02-05" | 5 February 1803
| George Bass
| style="text-align:center;" | 32
| Port Jackson, Australia
| The British explorer of Australia set sail from Sydney for South America and was never heard from again.
| style="text-align:center;" |
|-
| data-sort-value="1804-12-01" | 1 December 1804
| James Tippett
| style="text-align:center;" | Unknown
| English Channel
She never reappeared. The Admiralty presumed that she had foundered and paid her off on 31 December 1804.
| style="text-align:center;" |
|-
| data-sort-value="1807" | 1807
| James Hawes
| style="text-align:center;" | Unknown
| Mediterranean Sea
| Moucheron disappeared in the eastern Mediterranean in early 1807, with some accounts specifying the Dardanelles. As no trace of her or her crew was ever found, this is pure conjecture. The Royal Navy officially paid her off effective 7 June 1807.
| style="text-align:center;" |
|-
| data-sort-value="1807–09" | c. September 1807
| John Sedley
| style="text-align:center;" | Unknown
| Unknown
| HMS Elizabeth disappeared without a trace, presumed to have foundered with all hands.
| style="text-align:center;" |
|-
| data-sort-value="1808–11" | c. November 1808
| John Logan
| style="text-align:center;" | Unknown
| Unknown
None of the three vessels was ever heard of again. The EIC declared that the value of its cargo on Experiment was £5,592.
| style="text-align:center;" |
|-
| data-sort-value="1809-03-01" | March 1809
| Hay MacDowall
| style="text-align:center;" | Unknown
| Cape of Good Hope, South Africa
| Scottish British Army officer MacDowall disappeared with the rest of the crew of the Lady Jane Dundas in March 1809, while sailing back home to England.
| style="text-align:center;" |
|-
| data-sort-value="1809-03" | 13/14 March 1809
| John James Ridge 
| style="text-align:center;" | Unknown
| Indian Ocean
Harrier fell behind and was never seen again. She was presumed to have foundered with all hands.
| style="text-align:center;" |
|-
| data-sort-value="1809-02-01" |27 August 1809
| J. Hill
| style="text-align:center;" | Unknown
| Atlantic Ocean
| Captain J. Hill disappeared with the rest of the crew of the Bellona in 1809, while sailing back home to England from Jamaica.
| style="text-align:center;" |
|-
| data-sort-value="1810-02-16" | 16 February 1810 or after
| John Bader
| style="text-align:center;" | Unknown
| Tasman Sea
| Bader, the commander of the ship Active, disappeared after landing a sealing party on the Open Bay Islands and subsequently setting sail for Sydney.
| style="text-align:center;" | 
|-
| data-sort-value="1813-01-02" | 2–3 January 1813
| Theodosia Burr Alston
| style="text-align:center;" | 29
| Coast of South Carolina, U.S.
| The daughter of U.S. Vice President Aaron Burr, and sometimes called the most educated American woman of her day, sailed from Georgetown, South Carolina, aboard the Patriot, which was never seen again.
| style="text-align:center;" |
|-
| data-sort-value="1814-10-01" | c. October 1814
| Johnston Blakeley
| style="text-align:center;" | 32–33
| Atlantic Ocean
| Blakeley, an officer in the United States Navy during the Quasi-War with France and the War of 1812, was in command of the sloop-of-war Wasp when it was lost in the Atlantic in October 1814.
| style="text-align:center;" |
|-
| data-sort-value="1814-02-28" | 28 February 1814
| John Davies
| style="text-align:center;" | Unknown
| English Channel
| Anacreon was last sighted on 28 February 1814 in the English Channel as she was returning from Lisbon. Soon thereafter, she disappeared without trace in a storm. All aboard were lost.
| style="text-align:center;"|
|-
| data-sort-value="1815-07" | c. July/August 1815
| John Downes
| style="text-align:center;" | Unknown
| Atlantic Ocean
|After the Dey signed a treaty, Decatur chose Epervier, under Lieutenant John T. Shubrick, Guerrieres former first lieutenant, to carry a copy of the treaty and some captured flags to the United States. Captain Lewis, and Lieutenants Neale and John Yarnall, came on board as passengers. Epervier sailed through the Straits of Gibraltar on 14 July 1815 and was never heard from again. Epervier may have encountered a hurricane reported in the Atlantic on 9 August 1815. In all, she was carrying 132 sailors and 2 marines.
| style="text-align:center;" |
|-
| data-sort-value="1815-08" | c. August 1815
| D.Grierson
| style="text-align:center;" | Unknown
| Unknown
|On 2 August 1815 as Preston was sailing from Jamaica to London in a convoy she encountered a gale that cost her her main and mizzen masts. A later report stated that Preston, Grierson, master, had been seen since the gale. The last report concerning the convoy of which Preston was one of the 89 vessels in the convoy that left Jamaica on 19 July, stated that Preston, Grierson, master, was one of the eight still missing.
| style="text-align:center;" |
|-
| data-sort-value="1816-07-01" | 8–17 January 1816
| Samuel Shaw
| style="text-align:center;" | Unknown
| Port Jackson, Australia
| The commander of the 90-ton brig Amelia, Shaw disappeared after departing from Port Jackson, Australia on the way to Java and Canton, China, carrying 50 tons of sandalwood and 5 tons of coal.
| style="text-align:center;" |
|-
| data-sort-value="1816-07-01" | July 1816
| George Winney
| style="text-align:center;" | Unknown
| Tasman Sea?
| The commander of the ship Whale, Winney and two crew members disappeared in July 1816 after heading out of Sydney bound for Hawkesbury.
| style="text-align:center;" |
|-
| data-sort-value="1816 or 1817" | 1816/1817
| Jonathon Read
| style="text-align:center;" | Unknown
| Location unknown
| Captain Jonathon Read commanded Anna when it was lost at sea in 1816 or 1817.
| style="text-align:center;" |
|-
| rowspan="3" data-sort-value="1821-01-28" | 28 January 1821
| Obed Hendricks
| style="text-align:center;" | Unknown
| rowspan="3"|Pacific Ocean
| rowspan="3"|Sailors on the whaler Essex, which sank in the Pacific on 20 November 1820 after being struck by a sperm whale. Their whaleboat was separated on the open sea from their fellow crewmen on 28 January 1821; it was never seen again. Years later, a boat with three skeletons inside was discovered washed up on Ducie Island, but the skeletons were not identified as being theirs.
| rowspan="3" style="text-align:center;" |
|-
| William Bond
| style="text-align:center;" | Unknown
|-
| Joseph West
| style="text-align:center;" | Unknown
|-
| data-sort-value="1822-04-22" | 22 April 1822
| Charles Lefebvre-Desnouettes
| style="text-align:center;" | 49
| Off the coast of Ireland
| The French military officer and general during the Napoleonic Wars later fled to America to escape prosecution from the loyalists. He was allowed to return, but presumably died when his ship sank off the coast of Ireland.
| style="text-align:center;" |
|-
| data-sort-value="1821-01-01" | c. 5 February 1823
| Jean Lafitte
| style="text-align:center;" | 42
| Gulf of Honduras
| French pirate and privateer Jean Lafitte was granted a commission from the Great Colombia government to take Spanish ships in June 1822. He is thought to have died on 5 February 1823 while trying to take two Spanish merchant vessels in the Gulf of Honduras, but rumors abounded that he had a different fate.
| style="text-align:center;" |
|-
| data-sort-value="1827-06-01" | June 1827
| Douglas Clavering
| style="text-align:center;" | 32–33
| near Sierra Leone
| Clavering, a British Royal Navy officer and Arctic explorer, served as a commander of HMS Redwing when it disappeared near Sierra Leone with all hands, never to be seen again.
| style="text-align:center;" |
|-
| data-sort-value="1831-04-01" | April 1831
| Carlo Giuseppe Bertero
| style="text-align:center;" | 42
| South Pacific Ocean
| The Italian naturalist and botanist known for documenting the flora and fauna in the West Indies and South America presumably died in a shipwreck while on a voyage from Tahiti to Chile.
| style="text-align:center;" |
|-
| data-sort-value="1835-07-17" | 17 July 1835
| Henry Hutton
| style="text-align:center;" | Unknown
| Unknown
| Forth departed from Manila on 17 July 1835 for London. She disappeared without a trace and was presumed to have foundered with the loss of all hands.
| style="text-align:center;" |
|-
| data-sort-value"1840-01-01" | 1840
| Rosalie
| style="text-align:center;" | Various
| Atlantic Ocean
| The Rosalie, a large French vessel, was found abandoned with sails set and cargo intact. Its crew had vanished.
| style="text-align:center;" |
|-
|rowspan="3" data-sort-value="1841-01-01" |17 March 1841
|Richard Roberts
|style="text-align:center;"|37–38
|rowspan="3" |Atlantic Ocean
|rowspan="3" |Roberts was the captain of the SS President when it disappeared in a gale while returning back to Liverpool from New York. Methodist clergyman Rev. George Grimston Cookman who served as the Chaplain of the Senate and Irish comic actor Tyrone Power were among the passengers who were lost.
|rowspan="3" style="text-align:center;" |
|-
|George Grimston Cookman
|style="text-align:center;"|40
|-
|Tyrone Power
|style="text-align:center;"|43
|-
| data-sort-value="1845-07-01" | July 1845
| Franklin's lost expedition
| style="text-align:center;" | 59 (Franklin)
| Victoria Strait
| The expedition led by Sir John Franklin, with 129 seamen, made last contact with a whaling ship before entering Victoria Strait in search of the Northwest Passage. The remains of some individuals, written messages and the wrecks of the ships HMS Erebus (in 2014) and HMS Terror (in 2016) were later discovered. However, the majority of the crew, including Franklin himself, were never found, with the crew having probably died from a combination of lead poisoning, starvation, and exposure.
| style="text-align:center;" |
|-
| data-sort-value="1849-10-07" | 7 October 1849
| Francisque Arban
| style="text-align:center;" | 34
| Mediterranean Sea
| Arban was a French balloonist renowned as the first person to cross the Alps in a balloon. On 7 October 1849, he took on a flight from Barcelona but was blown over to the Mediterranean Sea, where he disappeared and is thought to have died.
| style="text-align:center;" |
|-
| data-sort-value="1852-05-17" | 17 May 1852
| Sir Montagu Chapman, 3rd Baronet
| style="text-align:center;" | 51
| Tasman Sea
| The Anglo-Irish landowner and High Sheriff of Westmeath in 1844 disappeared while sailing from Melbourne to Sydney, Australia.
| style="text-align:center;" |
|-
| data-sort-value="1854-09" | 28 or 29 September 1854
| James Thompson Gerry
| style="text-align:center;" | Unknown
| Caribbean Sea
| As of 30 June 1854, the crew of Albany consisted of 18 officers, 156 seaman, and 23 Marines. It is likely the ship's complement was little changed when she was lost three months later. The crew included several sons and grandsons of prominent men: Commander James T. Gerry, youngest son of Elbridge Gerry, formerly Vice President of the United States, Lieutenant John Quincy Adams, grandson of the second president and nephew of the sixth, and Midshipman Bennet Israel Riley, son of Brevet General Bennet C. Riley, the former military governor of California during its statehood controversy.
| style="text-align:center;" |
|-
|rowspan="2" |23 January 1856
|Asa Eldridge
|style="text-align:center;"| 47
|rowspan="2" |Atlantic Ocean
|rowspan="2" | Eldridge was the commander of the SS Pacific when it disappeared under mysterious circumstances while sailing to New York from Liverpool. The Bishop of Hartford Bernard O'Reilly, who was returning from a trip to Europe, was among those lost.
|rowspan="2" style="text-align:center;"|
|-
|Bernard O'Reilly
|style="text-align:center;"| 52
|-
| data-sort-value="1867-03-01" | March 1867
| Trevarton Charles Sholl
| style="text-align:center;" | 22
| Australia
| Sholl, a government official and explorer, was lost at sea when the schooner Emma disappeared during a storm.
| style="text-align:center;" |
|-
| rowspan="3" data-sort-value="1872-12-04" | 4 December 1872
| Captain Benjamin Briggs and crew
| style="text-align:center;" | 37
| rowspan="3"|Atlantic Ocean near Azores
Their unexplained disappearances are at the core of "one of the most durable mysteries in nautical history".
| rowspan="3" style="text-align:center;" |
|-
| Sarah Elizabeth Briggs
| style="text-align:center;" | 31
|-
| Sophia Matilda Briggs
| style="text-align:center;" | 2
|-
|-
|-
| data-sort-value="1880-01-01" | c. 14 February 1880
| Crew of HMS Juno
| style="text-align:center;" | Various
| Atlantic Ocean
| HMS Juno disappeared while sailing from Royal Naval Dockyard in Bermuda en route to Falmouth, England on 31 January 1880. The vessel is presumed to have sunk in a storm sometime between 12 and 16 February.
| style="text-align:center;" |
|-
| data-sort-value="1880-10-10" | 10 October 1880
| Lamont Young
| style="text-align:center;" | 28–29
| Bermagui, Australia
| Young, a government geologist inspecting new gold fields on behalf of the New South Wales Mines Department, together with his assistant Max Schneider, boat owner Thomas Towers and two other men disappeared after leaving Bermagui, New South Wales, Australia in a small boat. The nearby location where the abandoned wreck of their boat was discovered was subsequently named Mystery Bay.
| style="text-align:center;" |
|-
| data-sort-value="1881-03-25" | 25 March 1881
| John Bristow Hughes
| style="text-align:center;" | 64
| Hobson's Bay, Australia
| Hughes, an English-Australian grazier and politician of the South Australian colony, is thought to have drowned on vacation while swimming, but his body was never recovered.
| style="text-align:center;" |
|-
| data-sort-value="1881-09-12" | 12 September 1881
| Charles W. Chipp
| style="text-align:center;" | 33
| Laptev Sea
| Chipp, an American naval officer and explorer, took part in the Jeannette expedition, which aimed to discover a route from the Pacific Ocean to the Bering Strait. The ship became crushed and sank in June 1881. After a long trek across the ice to the water, the crew set out in three small boats, but later became separated in a storm. The boat that Chipp was commanding was never seen again.
| style="text-align:center;" |
|-
| data-sort-value="1881-12-10" | 10 December 1881
| Walter Powell
| style="text-align:center;" | 39
| English Channel
| Walter Powell, a Welsh politician member of the Conservative party member in the House of Commons in between 1868 and 1881 as well as a colliery owner, disappeared in a balloon over the English Channel on 10 December 1881 and was never seen again.
| style="text-align:center;" |
|-
| data-sort-value="1884-08-29" | 29 August 1884
| Resolven
| style="text-align:center;" | Various
| Labrador, Canada
| The merchant ship Resolven was found abandoned off the coast of Labrador on 29 August. A lifeboat was missing and it was assumed that all 11 on board had evacuated in the face of nearby icebergs, but neither they nor the lifeboat were ever found.
| style="text-align:center;" |
|-
| data-sort-value="1886-07-22" | 22 July 1886
| James Henry Van Alen
| style="text-align:center;" | 66
| Atlantic Ocean
| A Union Army brigadier general, Van Alen either fell or jumped into the sea while on board the RMS Umbria, while returning home from a trip to England.
| style="text-align:center;" |
|-
| data-sort-value="1889-09-29" | 29 September 1889
| William Jackson
| style="text-align:center;" | 56
| Tasman Sea
| Jackson, an English-born New Zealand Member of Parliament who represented the Waikato region from 1872 to 1875, went missing while travelling on board the SS Rotorua. It is presumed he became sick and fell overboard.
| style="text-align:center;" |
|-
| data-sort-value="1890-07-12" | 12 July 1890
| Archduke Johann Salvator of Austria
| style="text-align:center;" | 37
| Cape Horn, Chile (presumed)
| A member of the House of Habsburg-Lorraine who renounced his royal titles and went on to live as a sailor, Salvator and his wife were presumably killed when their ship was sunk during a storm in Cape Horn, but other theories have been proposed that Salvator instead assumed a new identity and lived the rest of his days in South America.
| style="text-align:center;" |
|-
|data-sort-value="1892-03-13"|13 March 1892
|Hermann Fol
|style="text-align:center;" | 46
|Bénodet, France
|Fol, a Swiss zoologist regarded as the father of modern cell biology, disappeared with several crew members of his yacht shortly after leaving Bénodet, France.
|style="text-align:center;"|
|-
|data-sort-value="1902-10-26"|26 October 1902
|Eduard von Toll
|44
|East Siberian Sea
|A group of Russian explorers led by Baron Eduard von Toll left Bennett Island in Siberia and were never seen again.
| style="text-align:center;"|
|-
|data-sort-value="1903-11-16"|On or After 16 November 1903
|Thomas Williams
|style="text-align:center;" | Unknown
|Indian Ocean
|In early 1904 speculation and concern about the missing ship appeared in the press.<
She was never heard from again and no scrap of wreckage was ever found. The crew consisted of :— Thomas Williams (master), J. M. Scott (first mate), G. Howell (second mate), J. A. Gibbons (carpenter), C. L. Williams (sailmaker), W. Williams (cook and steward), A. Gaerkens, H. Skinner, D. Friel, T. Williams, T. T. Gunn, J. L. James, G. Hartfield, L. J. Monoghan, C. Burns, S.Thomas (boy). The captain's wife (Mrs. Williams) was also on the articles as stewardess. Five men: N. M. McKcnzie, F. Bucknall. R. Leppar, C. Nelson, joined the vessel at Port Adelaide. F. Bucknall was the son of Frederick Estcourt Bucknall, a former parliamentarian, brewer and real estate developer who lost his fortune in a recent recession.
|style="text-align:center;"|
|-
|data-sort-value="1909-07-26"|27 July 1909
|Waratah
|style="text-align:center;" | Various
|Mbhashe River, Colony of Natal
|The SS Waratah, a 500-foot passenger and cargo steamship built in 1908 by the Blue Anchor Line to operate between Europe and Australia, disappeared on her second voyage from Durban to Cape Town with 211 passengers and crew aboard. The last confirmed sighting of her was by a fellow steamer on 27 July, and her ultimate fate remains unknown.
|style="text-align:center;"|
|-
| data-sort-value="1909-11-14" | 14 November 1909
| Joshua Slocum
| style="text-align:center;" | 65
| Martha's Vineyard, Massachusetts, U.S.
| Slocum, a Canadian-American sailor and first man to sail single-handedly around the world (1895–1898), disappeared after setting sail from Vineyard Haven on Martha's Vineyard alone, bound for South America, aboard the same  sloop Spray he had used for his circumnavigation.
| style="text-align:center;" |
|-
| data-sort-value="1910-12-22" | 22 December 1910
| Cecil Grace
| style="text-align:center;" | 30
| English Channel
| Pioneer aviator Grace disappeared over the English Channel on 22 December 1910 while returning to Eastchurch via Dover from Calais after having gone there to attempt to win the Baron de Forest Prize, but deciding not to due to strong winds. His pilot's goggles and cap were recovered on 6 January 1911, and his body was possibly found on 14 March 1911, but was too badly disfigured to be identifiable.
| style="text-align:center;" |
|-
| data-sort-value="1911-06-05" | 5 June 1911
| Édouard Bague
| style="text-align:center;" | 32
| Mediterranean Sea
| Bague, a former lieutenant in the Algerian tirailleurs and aviator, disappeared while attempting to cross the Mediterranean Sea without a compass. Several expeditions to locate the plane or Bague's remains were made, but no trace was ever found.
| style="text-align:center;" |
|-
| data-sort-value="1912-04-18" | 18 April 1912
| Damer Leslie Allen
| style="text-align:center;" | 34
| Irish Sea
| Allen, an Irish-born British aviator, disappeared on 18 April 1912 while attempting to fly solo from Holyhead, Wales, to Ireland in a Blériot monoplane.
| style="text-align:center;" |
|-
|rowspan="2" data-sort-value="1912-01-01" |c. 1913
|Vladimir Rusanov
|style="text-align:center;"| 38
|rowspan="2" |Kara Sea
|rowspan="2"|Rusanov, a Russian geologist and Arctic explorer, led an expedition with the initial goal of establishing mineral claims on Spitsbergen, but later expanded to include investigating the Northeast Passage. They sailed in the Hercules captained by Alexander Kuchin. The expedition was last heard from in August 1912, when Rusanov sent a message stating that he was continuing east, before disappearing a year later in the Kara Sea. Artefacts found decades later show that they managed to cross that sea.
| rowspan="2" style="text-align:center;" |
|-
|Alexander Kuchin
|style="text-align:center;"| 24
|-
| data-sort-value="1913-10-13" | 13 October 1913
| Albert Jewell
| style="text-align:center;" | 27
| North Atlantic Ocean
| Jewell, an early US aviator, disappeared off Long Island, New York, on 13 October 1913, en route to Oakwood, Staten Island, in order to take part in The New York Times American Aerial Derby.
| style="text-align:center;" |
|-
| data-sort-value="1914-05-23" | 23 May 1914
| Gustav Hamel
| style="text-align:center;" | 24–25
| English Channel
| Hamel, a British aviation pioneer who was most prominent for developing and promoting flying in Hendon Aerodrome, disappeared over the English Channel while flying a new plane. In July, a fishing vessel saw a body floating in the ocean, which, although they didn't retrieve it, was believed to be Hamel's.
| style="text-align:center;" |
|-
| data-sort-value="1914-08-18" | 18/19 August 1914
| Albert Johan Petersson
| style="text-align:center;" | 44
| Bergen
| Swedish chemist, engineer and industrialist Albert Petersson disappeared during a boat trip from Odda, Norway to Bergen.
| style="text-align:center;" |
|-
| data-sort-value="1914-12-03" | 3 December 1914
| Harald Kristian Dannevig
| style="text-align:center;" | 43
| Macquarie Island
| Dannevig, a Norwegian-born Australian superintendent of fisheries for New South Wales, disappeared during an investigation on 3 December 1914.
| style="text-align:center;" |
|-
| data-sort-value="1916-09" | c. September 1916
| Karl Schwartzkopf
| style="text-align:center;" | Unknown
| Atlantic Ocean
| Bremen departed Bremerhaven in September 1916 for Norfolk, Virginia, commanded by Kapitänleutnant Karl Schwartzkopf, and reportedly carrying financial credits for Simon Lake to begin building cargo submarines for Germany. It did not complete this voyage and Bremen's fate is a mystery. Several views have been put forth as to the nature of her fate. German U-boat U-53 had been assigned to join Bremen as protection against British attacks but failed to make contact. Its commander Hans Rose reported having heard a radio broadcast on 28 September 1916 stating that Bremen had been sunk.
| style="text-align:center;" |
|-
| data-sort-value="1917-04-15" | 15 April 1917
| Marc Armand Ruffer
| style="text-align:center;" | 57
| Aegean Sea
| Ruffer was a Swiss-born British experimental pathologist and bacteriologist, who is considered a pioneer of modern paleopathology.
| style="text-align:center;" |
|-
| data-sort-value="1918-02-13" | 13 February 1918
| René Audry (Commander & 22 crew)
| style="text-align:center;" | Unknown
| Unknown
| Bernoullis final patrol was in February 1918, on close blockade duty off Cattaro. The submarine was not heard from after 13 February 1918 and is believed to have struck a mine off Cattaro and sunk. All 23 of her crew were lost. Her commander, Rene Audry, was honoured by having a submarine named after him.
| style="text-align:center;" |
|-
| data-sort-value="1918-10-01" | c. November 1918
| Arthur Cravan
| style="text-align:center;" | 33
| Salina Cruz, Mexico
| Swiss writer, poet, artist and boxer Arthur Cravan was last seen in Salina Cruz, Mexico around November 1918.
| style="text-align:center;" |
|-
| data-sort-value="1919-01-01" | c. 1919
| Paul Knutsen
| style="text-align:center;" | Unknown
| Cape Chelyuskin
| A Norwegian seaman who accompanied explorer Roald Amundsen on an expedition to the Arctic, but were left behind due to his companion Peter Tessem having chronic headaches, rendering him unable to survive the journey back home. They were instructed to wait for the freeze-up and travel towards Dikson when the opportunity arises, but both disappeared along the way. Tessem's body was found and buried several years later, while Knutsen's was never located.
| style="text-align:center;" |
|-
| data-sort-value="1919-10-26" | 26 October 1919
| Marie Empress
| style="text-align:center;" | 35
| Atlantic Ocean
| Empress, a British silent film actress, was last seen in Stateroom 480 on the SS Orduña the night before its arrival in New York City.
| style="text-align:center;" |
|-
| data-sort-value="1920-02-21" | 21 February 1920
| Croye Pithey
| style="text-align:center;" | 24
| Irish Sea
| Pithey, a South African flying ace and balloon buster, crashlanded while conducting a ferry operation. Neither his remains nor plane were ever recovered.
| style="text-align:center;" |
|-
| data-sort-value="1921-01-26" | 26 January 1921
| Hans Jakob Hansen
| style="text-align:center;" | Various
| Atlantic Ocean
| Hewitt left fully loaded from Sabine Pass, Port Arthur, Texas on 20 January 1921. She was bound for Portland, Maine with a stop in Boston, Massachusetts. She made her regular radio calls on 24 January and 25 January, and reported nothing unusual. From that time to this, she remains missing. No further radio signals from her were received. After the Hewitt failed to arrive in Boston on its expected due date of 29 January, Union Sulphur sent the ship's wireless call (K I L) through Atlantic coastal stations, and notified the U.S. Navy. A huge search along her route found nothing.
| style="text-align:center;" |
|-
| data-sort-value="1921-01-31" | 31 January 1921
| Carroll A. Deering
| style="text-align:center;" | Various
| Cape Hatteras, North Carolina, U.S.
| The captain and ten crewmen of the schooner Carroll A. Deering were missing when the schooner was found run aground off Cape Hatteras, North Carolina, on 31 January 1921. A mutiny was suspected, but the reason for their disappearance has never been established.
| style="text-align:center;" |
|-
| data-sort-value="1921-11-26" | 26 November 1921
| Charles Whittlesey
| style="text-align:center;" | 37
| Atlantic Ocean
| The American soldier and Medal of Honor recipient who led the "Lost Battalion" in World War I was last seen on the evening of 26 November 1921 on a passenger ship bound from New York City to Havana. It is presumed he committed suicide by jumping overboard.
| style="text-align:center;" |
|-
| data-sort-value="1922-09-20" | 20 September 1922
| Giuseppe Sartorio
| style="text-align:center;" | 68
| Atlantic Ocean
| Sartorio, an Italian sculptor, disappeared while travelling on board the steamer Tocra, which was returning to Italy from Canada.
| style="text-align:center;" |
|-
| rowspan="2" data-sort-value="1927-05-08" | c. 8 May 1927
| Charles Nungesser
| style="text-align:center;" | 31
| rowspan="2"|Atlantic Ocean
| rowspan="2"|Both French aviators disappeared with their Levasseur PL.8 L'Oiseau Blanc while attempting to make the first non-stop transatlantic flight from Paris to New York.
| rowspan="2" style="text-align:center;" |
|-
| François Coli
| style="text-align:center;" | 45
|-
| data-sort-value="1927-08-16" | 16 August 1927
| Mildred Doran
| style="text-align:center;" | 22
| Pacific Ocean
| The Canadian aviation enthusiast and sole woman to participate in the Dole Air Race vanished at sea like several other competitors, and was never found.
| style="text-align:center;" |
|-
| data-sort-value="1927-08-18" | 18 August 1927
| William Portwood Erwin
| style="text-align:center;" | 28
| Pacific Ocean
| Lt. Erwin was an American flying ace active during World War I, credited with eight aerial victories. He vanished while participating in the Dole Air Race spanning between Oakland, California and Hawaii, and is believed to drowned in the ocean.
| style="text-align:center;" |
|-
| rowspan="3" data-sort-value="1927-08-31" |31 August 1927
| Frederick F. Minchin
| style="text-align:center;" | 37
| rowspan="3" |Atlantic Ocean
| rowspan="3" |Hamilton, a British flying ace credited with six aerial victories, pilot Minchin and the Princess disappeared over the Atlantic Ocean while attempting the first non-stop east-west flight across the Atlantic Ocean. The plane St. Raphael, owned by passenger Princess Anne, was last seen flying over the Atlantic by an oil tanker, and was never seen again
| rowspan="3" style="text-align:center;" |
|-
| Leslie Hamilton
| style="text-align:center;" | Unknown
|-
| Princess Anne of Löwenstein-Wertheim-Freudenberg
| style="text-align:center;" | 63
|-
| rowspan="3" data-sort-value="1927-09-06" | 6 September 1927
| James DeWitt Hill
| style="text-align:center;" | 45
| rowspan="3"|Atlantic Ocean
| rowspan="3"|Hill and Bertaud were American aviators who disappeared aboard the Old Glory while attempting a transatlantic flight, accompanied by Payne, the editor of the New York Daily Mirror. One of the plane's wings was later found off the coast of Cape Race, but no trace of the crew was ever found.
| rowspan-"3" style="text-align:center;" |
|-
| Lloyd W. Bertaud
| style="text-align:center;" | 31
|-
| Philip A. Payne
| style="text-align:center;" | Unknown
|-
| rowspan="4" data-sort-value="1927-12-23" | 23 December 1927
| Oskar Omdal
| style="text-align:center;" | 31
| rowspan="4"|Atlantic Ocean
| rowspan="4"|In 23 December 1927, Grayson, pilot Omdal, navigator Goldsborough, and radio engineer Koehler took off from Curtiss Field in order to set the record for the first woman to cross the Atlantic, but the plane disappeared at sea. No trace of either the plane or the crew has been found since.
| rowspan="4" style="text-align:center;" |
|-
| Frances Wilson Grayson
| style="text-align:center;" | 35
|-
| Brice Goldsborough
| style="text-align:center;" | 38
|-
| Frank Koehler
| style="text-align:center;" | Unknown
|-
| rowspan="2" data-sort-value="1928-01-10" | 10 January 1928
| John Moncrieff
| style="text-align:center;" | 34
| rowspan="2"|Tasman Sea
| rowspan="2"|The pair of New Zealanders were the first to attempt the Trans-Tasman flight from New Zealand to nearby Australia. After their departure from Sydney, neither the pilots or the aircraft were ever seen again.
| rowspan="2" style="text-align:center;" |
|-
| George Hood
| style="text-align:center;" | 37
|-
| rowspan="2" data-sort-value="1928-03-13" | 13 March 1928
| Walter G. R. Hinchliffe
| style="text-align:center;" | 34
| rowspan="2"|Atlantic Ocean
| rowspan="2"|Hinchliffe, a decorated flying ace, and Mackay, an actress and aviation pioneer, attempted to cross the Atlantic Ocean in a bid for Mackay to become the first woman to have succeeded in the Transatlantic flight. The plane was last seen near the west of Cork, Ireland, but nothing more is known of it.
| rowspan="2"style="text-align:center;" |
|-
| Elsie Mackay
| style="text-align:center;" | 35
|-
| data-sort-value="1928-05-25" | 25 May 1928
| Aldo Pontremoli
| style="text-align:center;" | 32
| Arctic Ocean
| Italian physicist Pontremoli joined the polar expedition of General Umberto Nobile who was in command of the airship Italia. The airship crash landed on ice, after which the airship envelope carrying Pontremoli, who was observed as alive and conscious, as well as five other people drifted away and disappeared.
| style="text-align:center;" |
|-
| rowspan="3" data-sort-value="1928-06-18" | 18 June 1928
| Roald Amundsen
| style="text-align:center;" | 55
| rowspan="3"|Barents Sea
| rowspan="3"|Norwegian polar region explorer Amundsen, French pilot Guilbaud and Norwegian pilot Dietrichson disappeared also with three other crew members on 18 June 1928 while flying on a rescue mission of the missing members of the Nobile crewin the Arctic, over the Barents Sea. The search for Amundsen and his team was called off in September 1928 by the Norwegian Government. No bodies were ever found.
| rowspan="3"style="text-align:center;" |
|-
| René Guilbaud
| style="text-align:center;" | 37
|-
| Leif Dietrichson
| style="text-align:center;" | 37
|-
| data-sort-value="1931-10-03" | 3 October 1931
| Lauro De Bosis
| style="text-align:center;" | 29
| Tyrrhenian Sea
| De Bosis, an Italian poet, aviator, and anti-fascist, took off from Marseille on a small Klemm L 25 heading for Corsica and then Italy. He reached Rome and circled over the city centre for a half hour, dropping thousands of antifascist leaflets. Before Italian Air Forces can arrive, he had flown off to sea for Corsica, never to be seen again.
| style="text-align:center;" |
|-
| data-sort-value="1934-12-03" | 3 December 1934
| Charles Ulm
| style="text-align:center;" | 36
| Pacific Ocean
| Ulm was an Australian aviator who, together with Sir Charles Kingsford Smith, was the founder of the Australian National Airways. In December 1934, he, his copilot and his navigator disappeared in the Pacific Ocean during a test flight from Oakland, California to Hawaii in the aircraft Stella Australis.
| style="text-align:center;" |
|-
| rowspan="2" data-sort-value="1935-11-08" | 8 November 1935
| Charles Kingsford Smith
| style="text-align:center;" | 38
| rowspan="2" |Andaman Sea
| rowspan="2" |Australian pioneer aviator Charles Kingsford Smith and co-pilot Tommy Pethybridge disappeared during an overnight flight from Allahabad, India, to Singapore while attempting to break the England–Australia speed record. A filmmaker claimed to have located Lady Southern Cross on the seabed in February 2009.
| rowspan="2" style="text-align:center;" |
|-
| Tommy Pethybridge
| style="text-align:center;" | Unknown
|-
| data-sort-value="1936-02-10" | 10 February 1936
| Émile Barrière
| style="text-align:center;" | 33
| South Atlantic Ocean
| Barrière, an early-20th-century French aviator who played a major role in the early development commercial aviation in South America, was a passenger on an Air France Latécoère 301 Ville de Buenos Aires which disappeared en route from Natal, Brazil to Dakar, French West Africa on 10 February 1936.
| style="text-align:center;" |
|-
| rowspan="2" data-sort-value="1936-10-01" | October 1936
| Brian Abbot
| style="text-align:center;" | 24–25
| rowspan="2" | Tasman Sea
| rowspan="2" |Brian Abbot was the stage name of Australian actor George Rikard Bell, who along with his sidekick and fellow actor Leslie Hay-Simpson mysteriously disappeared after setting out from Lord Howe Island for Sydney in October 1936; they were never seen again despite a week long search having taken place to find them. A significant number of boats have disappeared around the same area where Abbot and Hay-Simpson disappeared. A boat with five men from Sydney also mysteriously vanished a few weeks after the disappearance of Abbot and Hay-Simpson and was also never seen again.
| rowspan="2" style="text-align:center;" |
|-
| Leslie Hay-Simpson
| style="text-align:center;" | Unknown
|-
| data-sort-value="1936-11-10" | 10 November 1936
| James Jenkins Simpson
| style="text-align:center;" | 54
| Aegean Sea
| Simpson, a British entomologist and marine biologist, was last seen at sea on the morning of 10 November 1936 and is believed to have drowned.
| style="text-align:center;" |
|-
| rowspan="2" data-sort-value="1937-07-02" | 2 July 1937
| Amelia Earhart
| style="text-align:center;" | 39
| rowspan="2"|Central Pacific Ocean
| rowspan="2"|American aviator Amelia Earhart was the first woman to try a circumnavigational flight of the globe. During the attempt, she and her navigator, Fred Noonan, disappeared over the central Pacific in the vicinity of Howland Island on 2 July 1937.
| rowspan="2" style="text-align:center;" |
|-
| Fred Noonan
| style="text-align:center;" | 44
|-
| data-sort-value="1937-08-13" | 13 August 1937
| Sigizmund Levanevsky
| style="text-align:center;" | 35
| Arctic Ocean
| Levanevsky, a Soviet aviator, with his crew of five and their Bolkhovitinov DB-A aircraft disappeared in the vicinity of the North Pole on the Arctic Ocean. They had reported a loss of power from one of their four Mikulin AM-34 engines while attempting to prove a transpolar route between Asia and North America commercially viable.
| style="text-align:center;" |
|-
| data-sort-value="1938-03-25" | 25 March 1938
| Ettore Majorana
| style="text-align:center;" | 32
| Tyrrhenian Sea
| An Italian physicist, Majorana disappeared in unknown circumstances during a boat trip from Palermo to Naples on 25 March 1938. There is some evidence that he was alive in South America in 1959 and that his disappearance was voluntary.
| style="text-align:center;" |
|-
| data-sort-value="1939-03-20" | 20 March 1939
| William Snodgrass
| style="text-align:center;" | 68–69
| Cook Strait
| Snodgrass, a New Zealand politician, disappeared from the inter-island ferry Arahura while travelling overnight from Wellington to Nelson on 20 March 1939.
| style="text-align:center;" |
|-
| rowspan="2" data-sort-value="1939-03-24" | 24 March 1939
| Richard Halliburton
| style="text-align:center;" | 39
| rowspan="2"|Pacific Ocean
| rowspan="2"|Halliburton, an American travel writer and adventurer, vanished while attempting to sail the Sea Dragon, a Chinese junk, across the Pacific Ocean, accompanied by photojournalist Paul Mooney. In 1945, wreckage identified as a rudder, and believed to belong to the Sea Dragon, washed ashore in San Diego.
| rowspan="2" style="text-align:center;" |
|-
| Paul Mooney
| style="text-align:center;" | 34
|-
| rowspan="2" data-sort-value="1940-03-01" | 1 March 1940
| Harold Whistler
| style="text-align:center;" | 43
| rowspan="2" |Gulf of Oman
| rowspan="2"| Whistler, an English fighter pilot and flying ace, and Pannirselvam, an Indian attorney and politician, along with 6 others disappeared on board the Handley Page H.P.42 Hannibal while returning to the UK from a trip to India.
| rowspan="2" style="text-align:center;" |
|-
| A. T. Pannirselvam
| style="text-align:center;" | 51
|-
| data-sort-value="1940-09-03" | 3 September 1940
| Elroy Guckert
| style="text-align:center;" | 40
| Location unknown
| Guckert, an American football and basketball coach, is said to have died in 1940 when he disappeared from a ship but his body was never recovered and he was never seen, so his fate remains unknown.
| style="text-align:center;" |
|-
| data-sort-value="1940-11-28" | 28 November 1940
| Helmut Wick
| style="text-align:center;" | 25
| English Channel
| Wick, a German Luftwaffe flying ace and wing commander credited with 56 aerial victories against the Allied powers, was shot down by British forces during the Battle of Britain. His body was never found.
| style="text-align:center;" |
|-
| data-sort-value="1940-11-28" | 28 November 1940
| John Dundas
| style="text-align:center;" | 25
| English Channel
| Dundas, an English RAF pilot and fighter ace believed to have shot down Helmut Wick, Nazi Germany's deadliest flying ace, was purportedly shot down himself moments later. His body was also never found.
| style="text-align:center;" |
|-
| data-sort-value="1941-01-05" | 5 January 1941
| Amy Johnson
| style="text-align:center;" | 37
| Thames Estuary, England
| An English pioneer pilot who was the first woman to fly solo from London to Australia, Johnson disappeared during a ferry flight after being blown off course due to bad weather and bailing out into the Thames Estuary, presumably dying.
| style="text-align:center;" |
|-
| data-sort-value="1941-04-20" | 20 April 1941
| Luigi Barbesino
| style="text-align:center;" | 46
| Mediterranean Sea
| Barbesino, an Italian association footballer and manager who represented his country at the 1912 Summer Olympics, later abandoned his job to serve in the Regia Aeronautica. During a training course, he and his six crewmen went missing during bad weather and were never seen again.
| style="text-align:center;" |
|-
| data-sort-value="1941-05-12" | 12 May 1941
| Zdzisław Henneberg
| style="text-align:center;" | 30
| English Channel
| Polish RAF airman and flying ace Henneberg ditched his plane in the English Channel during the Battle of Britain. He was last seen floating in the water, but a two-day search was unable to find him.
| style="text-align:center;" |
|-
| data-sort-value="1941-11-30" | 30 November 1941
| Esmond Romilly
| style="text-align:center;" | 23
| North Sea
| Romilly, a British socialist and journalist, disappeared during a bombing raid on Hamburg, with neither his body or the plane's wreckage ever being found.
| style="text-align:center;" |
|-
| data-sort-value="1942-04-14" | 14 April 1942
| David Wanklyn
| style="text-align:center;" | 30
| Mediterranean Sea
| Wanklyn disappeared along with his crew while aboard HMS Upholder on 14 April 1942 in the Mediterranean Sea and is believed to have been killed.
| style="text-align:center;" |
|-
| data-sort-value="1942-05-05" | 5 May 1942
| Gerhard Köppen
| style="text-align:center;" | 23
| Sea of Azov, Russia
| Gerhard Köppen was a German Luftwaffe flying ace as well as a recipient of the Knight's Cross with Oak Leaves who disappeared on 5 May 1942 after he was last seen swimming in the Sea of Azov with Soviet boats going after him. He was officially declared dead on 30 May 1969.
| style="text-align:center;" |
|-
| data-sort-value="1942-05-08" | 8 May 1942
| William B. Ault
| style="text-align:center;" | 43
| Chuuk State, Federated States of Micronesia
| Ault, a U.S. Navy commander, disappeared together with his radioman, William T. Butler, during the Battle of the Coral Sea. Neither man's remains were ever recovered.
| style="text-align:center;" |
|-
| data-sort-value="1942-06-05" | 5 June 1942
| Samuel Adams
| style="text-align:center;" | 30
| Pacific theatre
| Samuel Adams was an officer in the United States Navy who disappeared on 5 June 1942 while flying in the Pacific theatre; he is believed to have been shot down.
| style="text-align:center;" |
|-
| data-sort-value="1942-08-01" | August 1942
| Jose Gozar
| style="text-align:center;" | 23–24
| Tanon Strait, Philippines
| The Filipino military aviator and flight officer of the Army Air Corps was presumably lost at sea with another officer while attempting to reach Mindoro under unfavorable weather conditions.
| style="text-align:center;" |
|-
| rowspan="2" data-sort-value="1942-08-16" | 16 August 1942
| Lt. Ernest Cody
| style="text-align:center;" | 27
| rowspan="2" |San Francisco Bay, California, U.S.
| rowspan="2" |U.S. Navy blimp L-8 drifted inland from its route doing antisubmarine patrol off the coast of California near San Francisco several hours after its crew, Lt. Ernest Cody and Ens. Charles Adams, radioed in that they were going to take a closer look at an oil slick. When the ship eventually crashed in Daly City, neither man was aboard. A massive search failed to find any trace of them; they were both declared dead a year later.
| rowspan="2" style="text-align:center;" |
|-
| Ens. Charles Adams
| style="text-align:center;" | 38
|-
| data-sort-value="1942-12-13" | 13 December 1942
| Brian Lane
| style="text-align:center;" | 25
| North Sea
| Lane, a British author and RAF flying ace, is thought to have been shot down by an enemy plane while flying over the North Sea. His remains have never been recovered.
| style="text-align:center;" |
|-
| data-sort-value="1943-04-05" | 5 April 1943
| Denver V. Truelove
| style="text-align:center;" | 24
| Mediterranean Sea
| A USAAF bombardier and member of the Doolittle Raiders who took part in bombing Japan in April 1942. The following year, while he and several others were participating in a bombing raid in Sicily, Italy, their plane was shot down. Truelove and two others' remains were never recovered.
| style="text-align:center;" |
|-
| data-sort-value="1943-07-08" | 8 July 1943
| Kenji Tsukagoshi
| style="text-align:center;" | 43
| Indian Ocean
| Tsukagoshi, a Japanese aviator and explorer, disappeared after departing from Singapore for Crimea in the prototype Tachikawa Ki-77.
| style="text-align:center;" |
|-
| data-sort-value="1943-07-13" | 13 July 1943
| Geoffrey Appleyard
| style="text-align:center;" | 26
| Mediterranean Sea near Sicily, Italy
| British Army officer Appleyard disappeared on a return flight from the Allied invasion of Sicily. His aircraft was never located, and it is presumed he was shot down by friendly fire.
| style="text-align:center;" |
|-
| data-sort-value="1943-10-04" | 4 October 1943
| Ernest Melville Charles Guest
| style="text-align:center;" | 23
| Bay of Biscay
| A Southern Rhodesian RAF pilot, Guest was last seen on 4 October 1943 when he was fighting six Ju 88s while on patrol with another plane. He was pronounced missing in January 1944.
| style="text-align:center;" |
|-
| data-sort-value="1943-10-04" | 4 October 1943
| Erwin Clausen
| style="text-align:center;" | 32
| North Sea
| Clausen, a German Luftwaffe military aviator and fighter ace who fought in multiple large-scale invasions and operations, was posted as missing in action on 4 October 1943 during a defence of the Reich mission.
| style="text-align:center;" |
|-
| 31 October 1943
| Jack Kraynick
| style="text-align:center;" |29
| Caribbean Sea
| Kraynick, an American football back who played for the North Carolina Tar Heels, and later a first lieutenant in the USAAF, disappeared while flying over the Caribbean Sea and is presumed to have died.
| style="text-align:center;" |
|-
| data-sort-value="1944-02-14" | 14 February 1944
| Theodore Kara
| style="text-align:center;" | 27
| Pacific Ocean
| Theodore Kara was an American boxer and a United States Army Air Corps radioman who disappeared on 14 February 1944 while flying over the Pacific Ocean and was never seen or heard from again.
| style="text-align:center;" |
|-
| data-sort-value="1944-04-20" | 20 April 1944
| Gerry Atwell
| style="text-align:center;" | 27
| Adriatic Sea
| Atwell, an Australian rugby footballer who served as a pilot in the RAAF, disappeared during a bombing raid on Italy. His remains were never recovered.
| style="text-align:center;" |
|-
| data-sort-value="1944-07-09" | 9 July 1944
| Ingvar Fredrik Håkansson
| style="text-align:center;" | 23
| English Channel
| The English-born Swedish volunteer fighter pilot for the RAF disappeared after having to eject from his aircraft. Neither he or his plane were ever recovered.
| style="text-align:center;" | 
|-
| data-sort-value="1944-07-26" | 26 July 1944
| USS Robalo crewmen
| style="text-align:center;" | Various
| South China Sea
| Although the U.S. Navy claimed the submarine USS Robalo was lost with all hands after failing to report while on a July 1944 patrol in the Philippines, Lt. Cmdr. Manning Kimmel (31) and three other crewmen are known to have survived. A note recovered by an Army prisoner of war claimed the four had been arrested as spies after reaching Palawan Island following the Robalo's 26 July collision with a Japanese mine just offshore. Another witness account says they were massacred following an air raid later that year but Japanese records do not indicate they were being held at the camp in question at that time. It is believed that they were killed in captivity, but officially their fate is still unknown.
| style="text-align:center;" | 
|-
| data-sort-value="1944-07-26" | 26 July 1944
| Leon Vance
| style="text-align:center;" | 27
| Atlantic Ocean
| Vance was a decorated veteran of World War II, serving in the United States Army Air Forces. He, and all aboard a C-54 Skymaster, disappeared while travelling across the Atlantic Ocean from England to the United States. This aircraft is believed to have crashed somewhere between Iceland and Newfoundland
| style="text-align:center;" | 
|-
| data-sort-value="1944-07-31" | 31 July 1944
| 
| style="text-align:center;" | 44
| Mediterranean Sea
| French author Antoine de Saint-Exupéry, who disappeared over the Mediterranean on a reconnaissance mission during July 1944, is believed to have died at that time. In August, an unidentifiable body, wearing a French uniform, was found in the sea near Carqueiranne and was buried there. In 2000, the wreckage of the aircraft flown by Saint-Exupéry was found on the seabed near Marseille.
| style="text-align:center;" | 
|-
|26 August 1944
|Toshio Kuroiwa
|style="text-align:center;"|35
|Off the Malay Peninsula
|Japanese IJN warrant officer and fighter pilot Kuroiwa participated in one of the first official shootdowns of enemy aircraft during the January 28 incident in 1932. After retiring from service, he and the civilian transport aircraft he was piloting disappeared off the Malay Peninsula, never to be seen again.
|style="text-align:center;"|
|-
| data-sort-value="1944-10-29" | 29 October 1944
| Alfonza W. Davis
| style="text-align:center;" | 24
| Adriatic Sea
| Davis, an American aviator and member of the Tuskegee Airmen, disappeared during a reconnaissance mission over the Adriatic Sea off the coast of Italy. He was presumed to have been killed, but his remains have never been found.
| style="text-align:center;" | 
|-
| data-sort-value="1944-11-07" | 7 November 1944
| Clint Castleberry
| style="text-align:center;" | 21
| Liberia
| Clint Castleberry was an American college football player and later a USAAF Lieutenant who disappeared on 7 November 1944 after taking off from Roberts Field in Liberia with another plane, and was later presumed dead after a Royal Air Force plane saw unidentified wreckage that was thought to have been from one of the planes.
| style="text-align:center;" | 
|-
|8 November 1944
|Peter Deinboll
| style="text-align:center;" | 29
|North Sea
|Deinboll, a Norwegian engineer and resistance fighter who took part in sabotage operations against German locomotives, disappeared in transit between the United Kingdom and Norway and was never seen again.
|style="text-align:center;"|
|-
| data-sort-value="1944-11-22" | 22 November 1944
| Johan Pitka
| style="text-align:center;" | 72
| Baltic Sea
| Pitka was an Estonian navy commander and prominent fighter in the Estonian War of Independence. In 1944, he returned to his country from his exile in Finland to fight against the Soviet occupying forces, but is thought to have been killed in action.
| style="text-align:center;" | 
|-
| data-sort-value="1944-12-15" | 15 December 1944
| Glenn Miller
| style="text-align:center;" | 40
| English Channel
| An American big band leader and recording artist, Miller went missing on the night of 15 December 1944 in a US Army UC-64 Norseman that disappeared over the English Channel while en route from the United Kingdom to Paris, France. Miller was on the flight to make arrangements for his band to entertain Allied servicemen.
| style="text-align:center;" | 
|-
|rowspan="3" data-sort-value="1945-01-17"|26 February 1945
|Millard Harmon
|style="text-align:center;" | 57
|rowspan="3" |Pacific Ocean
|rowspan="3" |Harmon, a United States Army Air Forces lieutenant general and one of the highest-ranking Americans to die in World War II, his chief of staff brigadier general Andersen, and pilot Savage disappeared while traveling between Kwajalein Atoll and Hawaii. The aircraft was never recovered.
|rowspan="3" style="text-align:center;"|
|-
|James Roy Andersen
|style="text-align:center;" | 40
|-
|F. E. Savage
|style="text-align:center;" | Unknown
|-
|rowspan="2" data-sort-value="1945-03-27"|27 March 1945
|Peter Drummond
|style="text-align:center;" |50
|rowspan="2" |North Atlantic Ocean
|rowspan="2" |Drummond, a Australian-born RAF senior commander, and Brabner, a British MP, along with many others disappeared with the Consolidated Liberator II Commando while on a flight from RAF Northolt to Lajes Field in the Azores, en route to Ottawa in Canada. 
|rowspan="2" style="text-align:center;"|
|-
|Rupert Brabner
|style="text-align:center;" |33
|-
|data-sort-value="1945-08-01"|1 August 1945
|Naoshi Kanno
|style="text-align:center;" | 23
|Off Yakushima, Ōsumi Islands, Japan
|A Japanese fighter ace with twenty-five confirmed kills, Kanno went missing off the island of Yakushima on 1 August 1945. His remains were never found.
|style="text-align:center;"|
|-
| data-sort-value="1948-01-30" | 30 January 1948
| Sir Arthur Coningham
| style="text-align:center;" | 53
| Bermuda Triangle
| A retired RAF Air Marshal, Sir Arthur Coningham disappeared when an Avro Tudor IV, G-AHNP Star Tiger, went missing over the western Atlantic. He was one of 25 passengers, together with six crewmen, who were lost when the flight from Santa Maria Airport in the Azores failed to reach its destination of Kindley Field, Bermuda. Star Tigers sister aircraft G-AGRE Star Ariel also disappeared over the western Atlantic, with the loss of all seven crewmen and 13 passengers, while flying from Bermuda to Kingston Airport, Jamaica, the following year.
| style="text-align:center;" | Avro 688 Tudor Mk.1 (G-AGRE c/n 1253) 1000aircraftphotos.com.
|-
| data-sort-value="1952-06-08" | 8 June 1952
| David Atcherley
| style="text-align:center;" | 48
| Mediterranean Sea
| A decorated Royal Air Force officer, Atcherley was lost at sea while on a 40-minute flight from Egypt to Nicosia, Cyprus. Despite extensive searches from British, Israeli, Turkish and American aircraft, neither he or his plane have ever been located.
| style="text-align:center;" | 
|-
| data-sort-value="1953-02-07" | 7 February 1953
| Holchu'''s 5 crew members
| style="text-align:center;" | Various
| Indian Ocean
She was later boarded by the crew of a British cargo ship, alerted by Windrushs radio warning. They found no trace of the crew and the Holchu was towed to Colombo. Holchu was carrying a cargo of rice and was in good condition, aside from a broken mast. Adequate supplies of food, water and fuel were found, and a meal had been prepared in the ship's galley. The fate of the Holchus crew remains unknown.
| style="text-align:center;" | 
|-
| data-sort-value="1955-11-10" | 10 November 1955
| Joyita| style="text-align:center;" | Various
| South Pacific Ocean
| On 10 November, the  merchant vessel Joyita was found abandoned, partially submerged and listing heavily to port, north of the Pacific island of Vanua Levu, part of Fiji. There was no sign of the 25 passengers and crew who had been aboard when it was last seen on its departure from Apia, Samoa five weeks earlier. An extensive investigation has failed to find any trace of the passengers or crew.
| style="text-align:center;" | 
|-
| data-sort-value="1955-11-23" | 23 November 1955
| SS Empire Adur| style="text-align:center;" | Various
| Unknown
| SS Empire Adur served for a further seven years but went missing under tow by the Philippines registered tug Albacore to Hong Kong for scrapping.
| style="text-align:center;" |
|-
| rowspan="3" data-sort-value="1956-03-10" | 10 March 1956
| Robert H. Hodgin
| style="text-align:center;" | 31
| rowspan="3"|Mediterranean Sea
| rowspan="3"|Three United States Air Force airmen, commander Captain Robert H. Hodgin, observer Captain Gordon M. Insley and pilot 2nd Lt. Ronald L. Kurtz disappeared when their B-47 failed to make contact with an aerial refueling tanker at 14,000 ft over the Mediterranean Sea. While the unarmed aircraft was transporting two different capsules of nuclear weapons material in carrying cases, a nuclear detonation was not possible.
| style="text-align:center;" rowspan="3"|DoD narrative summaries of accidents involving U.S. nuclear weapons 1950–1980 
|-
| Gordon M. Insley
| style="text-align:center;" | 32
|-
| Ronald L. Kurtz
| style="text-align:center;" | 22
|-
| data-sort-value="1956-04-29" | 29 April 1956
| Lionel "Buster" Crabb
| style="text-align:center;" | 46
| Portsmouth Harbour
| Crabb, a retired British Royal Navy frogman, disappeared during an MI6 mission to spy on the Soviet  . The coroner concluded that a body (missing its head and hands) in a frogman suit found floating in Chichester Harbour the following year was Crabb's but a positive identification was never made nor cause of death determined.
| style="text-align:center;" | 
|-
| data-sort-value="1958-07-01" | July 1958
| Lynne C. Quiggle
| style="text-align:center;" | 52
| North Pacific Ocean
| An American rear admiral serving in the Navy, Quiggle disappeared aboard the SS President Cleveland on his way back to California from a trip to Tokyo. His body was never found, and he is officially listed as "lost at sea" due to unknown circumstances.
| style="text-align:center;" | 
|-
| rowspan="2" data-sort-value="1958-11-09" | 9 November 1958
| Harry Frank Broadbent
| style="text-align:center;" | 48
| rowspan="2" |Atlantic Ocean
| rowspan="2" |Broadbent, a British pilot who took part in air racing and record-breaking flights in the 1930s, piloted Martin PBM Mariner CS-THB named "Porto Santo" from Cabo Ruivo Seaplane Base near Lisbon, headed for Funchal, Madeira. Accompanied by co-pilot Rowell, 4 other crew and 30 passengers, a radio message code "QUG" (meaning "I am forced to land immediately") was received when the plane would have been over the Atlantic. No trace of the aircraft or its occupants was subsequently found.
| rowspan="2" style="text-align:center;" |1958 / NOV / 09 – Accident with the Seaplane – CS-THB – disappeared between Lisbon and Funchal GIAA Final Report (in Portuguese)
|-
| Thomas Rowell
| style="text-align:center;" | Unknown
|-
| data-sort-value="1959-10-28" | 28 October 1959
| Camilo Cienfuegos
| style="text-align:center;" | 27
| Straits of Florida
| A Cuban revolutionary and friend of Fidel Castro, Camilo Cienfuegos disappeared when his Cessna 310 went missing over the Straits of Florida during a night flight from Camagüey to Havana.
| style="text-align:center"|
|-
| data-sort-value="1961-09-09" | 9 September 1961
| 
| style="text-align:center;" | 39
| Pacific Ocean near Santa Monica, California, U.S.
| Webster was a journalist for the Los Angeles Daily News, The Saturday Evening Post and a World War II veteran with "Easy" Company of the 506th Parachute Infantry Regiment, 101st Airborne Division (the subject of the book and miniseries Band of Brothers). He disappeared while shark fishing near the Santa Monica coast and is presumed to have drowned.
| style="text-align:center;" | 
|-
| data-sort-value="1962-06-16" | 16 June 1962
| Private Colin Luke
| style="text-align:center;" | 21
| Gibraltar/Straits of Gibraltar
| A soldier in the 1st Battalion, Somerset and Cornwall Light Infantry Regiment, went missing while attempting to swim alone around the Rock of Gibraltar from Little Bay to Eastern Beach. His clothes were found in Little Bay by Police Constable Conroy. Private Gordon Ashworth was the last person to see Colin Luke at Europa Point Barracks before he disappeared.
| style="text-align:center;" | 
|-
| data-sort-value="1964-10-11" | 11 October 1964
| Holly Roth
| style="text-align:center;" | 48
| Atlantic Ocean
| Roth, an American crime novelist, disappeared on 11 October 1964 while sailing on a ketch with her husband 20 miles north of Safi, Morocco. They departed Gibraltar for the Canary Islands on 8 October 1964. Her husband reported her missing about 4 AM while she was on watch, and reported a collision with another vessel. Her body was never recovered.
| 
|-
| rowspan="2" data-sort-value="1967-01-17" | 17 January 1967
| Audrey Bruce Currier
| style="text-align:center;" | 33
| rowspan="2"|Coast of San Juan, Puerto Rico
| rowspan="2"|American heiress Audrey Bruce Currier and her husband Stephen Currier, wealthy philanthropists described as one of the richest young couples in the world, vanished at sea sometime after 7:30 pm on the evening of 17 January 1967, on a routine  charter flight from San Juan, Puerto Rico to St. Thomas in the Virgin Islands. Their plane, a Piper Apache piloted by John D. Watson (52) of Airplane Charters Inc., was last heard from when the pilot radioed at 7:30 pm for permission to overfly the US Naval base at Isla Culebra, which was denied. The plane was never seen or heard from again. Because the pilot had failed to file a flight plan, the search for the plane did not commence until 5 am, 9 hours after it failed to arrive in St. Thomas. Despite an extensive air-sea search by the US Coast Guard, no trace of the plane or its passengers was ever found. Audrey Currier was a granddaughter of the financier Andrew Mellon and the daughter of senior US diplomat David K. E. Bruce, while her husband Stephen was the son of socialite Mary Warburg. The Curriers had for the past ten years provided millions of dollars in financial support to the civil rights movement in the US through the Taconic Foundation and an umbrella group they founded, the Council for United Civil Rights Leadership.
| rowspan="2" style="text-align:center;" | Grove, Lloyd, "Child of Fortune, Take 2" The Washington Post, 8 July 1998. Retrieved 14 February 2018.
|-
| Stephen Currier
| style="text-align:center;" | 36
|-
| data-sort-value="1967-12-17" | 17 December 1967
| Harold Holt
| style="text-align:center;" | 59
| Cheviot Beach, Australia
| Holt, the Prime Minister of Australia, disappeared while swimming in heavy surf at a beach notorious for strong and dangerous rip currents. Despite one of the largest search-and-rescue operations ever mounted in Australia, his body was never found.
| style="text-align:center;" | Coroner rules Holt conspiracy theories 'fanciful' ABC News, 2 September 2005.
|-
| data-sort-value="1968-01-01" | 1968
| Arthur Piver
| style="text-align:center;" | 58
| Atlantic Ocean
| Piver was an American boatbuilder credited with pioneering the design of the multihull. An eager amateur sailor, Piver set out to participate in the 1968 Single-Handed Trans-Atlantic Race, but was never seen again.
| style="text-align:center;" | 
|-
| data-sort-value="1969-05-22" | 22 May 1969
| Paul Meyer
| style="text-align:center;" | 23
| English Channel
| Meyer, a USAF aircraft mechanic, stole a Lockheed C-130 Hercules while on a drinking binge, which he later crashed in the English Channel. The wreckage's remains were only discovered in 2018.
| style="text-align:center;" | 
|-
| data-sort-value="1969-07-10" | 10 July 1969
| Donald Crowhurst
| style="text-align:center;" | 36
| Atlantic Ocean
| Crowhurst was a competitor in the Sunday Times Golden Globe single-handed nonstop around the world yacht race. An inexperienced yachtsman, Crowhurst fabricated his progress in the race through fake log entries, the last of which being dated 1 July 1969. His boat was found abandoned on 10 July 1969.
| style="text-align:center;" |
|}

 1970–present 

 Solved cases 

Below is a list of people who were found, dead or alive, or their fate became known, after disappearing mysteriously at sea.

 13th century–1969 
{|class="wikitable sortable plainrowheaders"
|- style="text-align:center;"
! width="105" | Date
! width="250" | Person(s)
! width="50" | Age
! width="150" | Missing from
! width="500px" | Circumstances
! width="10px" | 
|-
| data-sort-value="1475-09-01" | September 1475
| Henry Holland, 3rd Duke of Exeter
| style="text-align:center;" | 45
| English Channel
| Lancastrian leader during the English Wars of the Roses. Holland fell overboard from unknown reasons and drowned in the English Channel while returning to Britain, having served within Edward IV's 1475 expedition to France. He was later found floating in the sea between Dover and Calais.
| style="text-align:center;" |
|-
| data-sort-value="1544-01-01" | 1544
| Hugh Willoughby
| style="text-align:center;" | unknown
| Arctic Sea
| English soldier and voyager who led a fleet of three vessels in search of a north-east route towards the Far East and his boat on route to Lapland. While neither the wreckage or his body were ever recovered, Willoughby's journal was. It has been suggested that he died from carbon monoxide poisoning.
| style="text-align:center"|
|-
| data-sort-value="1695-01-01" | 1695
| Ouzel Galley
| style="text-align:center;" |Various
| Uncertain, possibly Smyrna
| The Ouzel was last seen in the autumn of 1695 leaving dock in Dublin under the command of Capt Eoghan Massey of Waterford. She reappeared—supposedly the triumphant victim of high seas piracy—in 1700. According to her captain, he and his crew had been commanded and forced to loot several locations including North Africa over the span of several years before overpowering their captors, retaking their vessel, and returning home unharmed.
| style="text-align:center;" |
|-
| data-sort-value="1704-01-01" | 1704
| Alexander Selkirk
| style="text-align:center;" | 28
| Robinson Crusoe Island
| Scottish Royal Navy officer and privateer was stranded on an unknown island in 1704 and was rescued five years later after he was imprisoned.
| style="text-align:center;" |
|-
| data-sort-value="1820-11-20" | 20 November 1820
| Essex crew
| style="text-align:center;" | various
| Pacific Ocean
| American whaler ship who was sunk by a sperm whale, leaving the 20-man crew stranded at sea for 93 days. The few surviving crew members were rescued by another whaler, the Dauphin, on 15 February 1821, and later told of their experiences in books.
| style="text-align:center;" |
|-
| data-sort-value="1897-01-01" | 1897
| Barney Barnato
| style="text-align:center;" | 46
| At sea, near the island of Madeira
| British entrepreneur and Randlord who disappeared at sea after mysteriously falling overboard was later found dead on 14 June 1897 at sea near Madeira, Portugal.
| style="text-align:center;" |
|-
| data-sort-value="1913-09-29" | 29 September 1913
| Rudolf Diesel
| style="text-align:center;" | 55
| English Channel
| The German inventor of the diesel engine disappeared from the steamer SS Dresden on the way from Antwerp to London. He retired to his cabin at about 10 p.m. and was never seen alive again. Ten days later, a corpse was found in the North Sea near Norway, but only personal items could be retrieved. On 13 October, these items were identified by Rudolf's son Eugen as belonging to his father.
| style="text-align:center;" |
|-
| data-sort-value="1916-01-01" | 1916
| Michael Joseph McNally
| style="text-align:center;" | 56
| Chesapeake Bay
| Michael Joseph McNally, a United States Marine Sergeant disappeared between 1 and 2 November 1916, while he was aboard a Baltimore Steam Packet Company steamer, and roughly three weeks later he was found dead.
| style="text-align:center;" |
|-
| data-sort-value="1918-01-01" | 1918
| Peter Tessem
| style="text-align:center;" | unknown
| Cape Chelyuskin
| Norwegian carpenter who, together with a seaman named Paul Knutsen, disappeared in Cape Chelyuskin after an expedition to the Arctic. Four years later, a mummified corpse with a golden watch engraved with Tessem's named was found, indicating that it was his remains. Knutsen's body was never found.
| style="text-align:center;" |
|-
| data-sort-value="1924-11-15" | 15 November 1924
| Artur de Sacadura Freire Cabral
| style="text-align:center;" | 43
| Northern Sea
| Portuguese aviator who, together with Gago Coutinho, conducted the First aerial crossing of the South Atlantic in 1922. Two years later, Cabral and his co-pilot would disappear while flying over the English channel, with only partial remains of their plane's wreckage recovered later on.
| style="text-align:center;" |
|-
| data-sort-value="1928-07-04" | 4 July 1928
| Alfred Loewenstein
| style="text-align:center;" | 51
| North Sea
| Belgian financier who fell out of his private plane while travelling from Croydon to Brussels. His body was found 15 days later near Boulogne, France.
| style="text-align:center;" |
|-
| data-sort-value="1941-11-01" | November 1941
| Thomas Welsby Clark
| style="text-align:center;" | 21
| Christmas Island
| Royal Australian Navy sailor aboard HMAS Sydney who died during a battle with the German cruiser Kormoran. His body washed ashore on 6 February 1942, but remained unidentified until 19 November 2021.
| style="text-align:center;" |
|-
| data-sort-value="1941-12-08" | 8 December 1941
| Robert Tills
| style="text-align:center;" | 23
| Malalang Bay, Philippines
| USN officer and pilot who became the first American naval officer killed during the Battle of the Philippines. His body was lost at sea, but was recovered in November 2007 and positively identified in December 2008.
| style="text-align:center"|
|-
| data-sort-value="1942-11-23" | 23 November 1942
| Poon Lim
| style="text-align:center;" | 24
| Off the coast of Belém, Brazil
| Chinese steward working on the British ship SS Benlomond, which was sunk by German submarine U-172. Lim managed to escape, but Lim found himself on a wooden raft with limited supplies, drifting across the sea for 133 days before being rescued on 5 April 1943.
| style="text-align:center"|
|-
| data-sort-value="1943-02-01" | February 1943
| Sam LoPresti
| style="text-align:center;" | 26
| Atlantic Ocean
| American ice hockey goaltender who was one of the few surviving sailors of the sunken vessel SS Roger B. Taney, which he boarded as part of his service in the Navy. LoPresti and other survivors were adrift in the sea for 42 days, before they were rescued off the coast of Brazil.
| style="text-align:center"|
|-
| data-sort-value="1943-01-01" | 1943
| Juran Hisao
| style="text-align:center;" | 41
| Pacific Ocean
| Japanese author of popular fiction who pioneered the use of black humor in the country. He was conscripted by the Imperial Japanese Navy and sent to fight in the Pacific, where he was declared missing in action. However, he safely returned to Chōshi a year later.
| style="text-align:center;" |
|-
| data-sort-value="1943-05-27" | 27 May 1943
| Louis Zamperini
| style="text-align:center;" | 26
| Oahu, Hawaii, U.S.
| Olympic distance runner and soldier serving on the B-24 bomber Green Hornet. Due to mechanical difficulties, the bomber crashed into the sea, killing most of the crew aside from Zamperini and two others. The trio drifted across the sea for 47 days, during which one man died, before Zamperini and his companion were captured by the Imperial Japanese Navy off the coast of the Marshall Islands. Zamperini was then held in POW camps until the end of the war.
| style="text-align:center"|<ref>{{cite web |title=Unbrokens Louis Zamperini: The rest of the story |url=http://www.cbn.com/tv/1422057738001 |access-date=9 March 2015 |website=CBN |df=dmy-all}}</ref>
|-
| data-sort-value="1943-04-22" | 22 April 1943
| Edward Blake Thompson
| style="text-align:center;" | 25
| North Atlantic Ocean
| A member of the Ontario Rugby Football Union. Thompson served within the Royal Canadian Air Force in World War II. He was one of eighty-six individuals lost at sea when the ship upon which he was traveling, the SS Amerika, was torpedoed by the German Submarine U-306 south of Cape Farewell, Greenland
| style="text-align:center"|
|-
| data-sort-value="1943-06-13" | 13 June 1943
| Nathan Bedford Forrest III
| style="text-align:center;" | 38
| Kiel, Nazi Germany
| Brigadier general of the USAAF who crashlanded in Germany during a bombing raid. His body was found washed up on Ruegen Island several months after he was reported missing.
| style="text-align:center"|
|-
| data-sort-value="1944-01-01" | January 1944
| Pappy Boyington
| style="text-align:center;" | 31
| Pacific Ocean
| Pappy Boyington was an American combat pilot during World War II who was shot down in January 1944 was captured and was detained for a year and a half. Boyington was released after the Surrender of Japan.
| style="text-align:center;" |
|-
| data-sort-value="1950-10-01" | 1 October 1950
| Robert W. Langwell
| style="text-align:center;" | unknown
| Near Chuksan-ri, South Korea
| USN seaman who was declared missing in action after falling overboard after the ship he was ensigned to, the minesweeper USS Magpie, struck a mine and sank. Langwell's body washed ashore and was buried by villagers, with his remains returned to the United States in 2008.
| style="text-align:center;" |
|-
| data-sort-value="1961-11-12" | 12 November 1961
| Terry Jo Duperrault
| style="text-align:center;" | 11
| The Bahamas
| Duperrault was the single survivor of the massacre aboard the Bluebelle, in which her parents and two siblings, as well as the captain's wife, were murdered by the captain, Julian Harvey. She was rescued three-and-a-half days later by the Captain Theo, and later told what had truly happened on board. Upon learning this, Harvey, who by then had returned to Miami, committed suicide.
| style="text-align:center"|
|-
| data-sort-value="1963-08-27" | 27 August 1963
| Jenny Cheok
| style="text-align:center;" | 21
| Sisters' Islands, Singapore
| Cheok, a bar waitress, was allegedly murdered by her boyfriend, Grand Prix driver and law student Sunny Ang, during a boat trip to Sisters' Island. While Cheok's body has never been found, Ang was tried, convicted and ultimately hanged for the murder.
| style="text-align:center;" |
|}

 1970–2009 

 2010–present 

 See also 

 Alexander Selkirk
 Cast Away Lists of people who disappeared
 Philip Ashton
 Robinson Crusoe''

References

Sources
 
 

Lists of people by cause of death
People, sea